Cornelius "Connie" Desmond (January 31, 1908 – March 10, 1983) was an American sportscaster, most prominently for the Brooklyn Dodgers of Major League Baseball.

Desmond began his career in 1932 as the voice of the minor league Toledo Mud Hens. In 1940, he was promoted to broadcasting the games of the AAA Columbus Red Birds.

Mel Allen was impressed enough with Desmond that he asked him to come to New York City as his sidekick on the home games of the Yankees and Giants in 1942. After one year, he left and joined Red Barber on the Dodgers broadcasts, replacing Al Helfer. During the 1943 season, Barber and Desmond were the only voices of baseball in New York; the Giants and Yankees suspended broadcasts that year for unknown reasons. Desmond remained with the Dodgers until he resigned in August 1956, teaming with Barber (1943–1953), Ernie Harwell (1948–1949), and Vin Scully (1950–1956).  In the 1940s Desmond also teamed with Barber to call college football and New York Giants football, and with Marty Glickman to call college basketball and New York Knicks basketball.

Desmond battled alcoholism for many years, and frequently missed games because he was too drunk to go on the air.  Dodgers owner Walter O'Malley finally lost patience with him and fired him before the 1955 World Series. Thus, Desmond missed his chance to call the Dodgers' only world title on the East Coast.  Desmond asked for and got another chance in 1956, but was fired for good after several more absences.  He was succeeded by Jerry Doggett.

Desmond was a fairly accomplished singer. In the early 1940s he hosted several music shows on WOR, with himself as the featured singer.

Desmond died March 10, 1983, in Toledo, Ohio at the age of 75.

References

External links
"Golden Voices of Baseball" book excerpt
obituary
Dodgers Encyclopedia

1908 births
1983 deaths
American radio sports announcers
Brooklyn Dodgers announcers
College basketball announcers in the United States
College football announcers
Major League Baseball broadcasters
Minor League Baseball broadcasters
National Basketball Association broadcasters
National Football League announcers
New York Giants announcers
New York Giants (NL) announcers
New York Knicks announcers
New York Yankees announcers
People from Toledo, Ohio